Fethi Laabidi is a Tunisian football manager.

References

Year of birth missing (living people)
Living people
Tunisian football managers
CS Hammam-Lif managers
ES Hammam-Sousse managers
Olympique Béja managers
Club Africain football managers
Tunisian Ligue Professionnelle 1 managers
Tunisian expatriate football managers
Expatriate football managers in Egypt
Tunisian expatriate sportspeople in Egypt
Expatriate football managers in Bahrain
Tunisian expatriate sportspeople in Bahrain
Expatriate football managers in the United Arab Emirates
Tunisian expatriate sportspeople in the United Arab Emirates